"Sailor Mouth" is the first segment of the 18th episode of the second season, and the 38th overall episode of the American animated television series SpongeBob SquarePants. It originally aired on Nickelodeon in the United States on September 21, 2001. In the episode, SpongeBob reads a "bad word" off a dumpster behind the Krusty Krab, but does not know what it means, which gets him into trouble with others.

The episode was directed by Andrew Overtoom for the animation and Walt Dohrn and Paul Tibbitt for the storyboards, and written by Dohrn, Tibbitt, and Merriwether Williams, while Carson Kugler, William Reiss, and Erik Wiese worked as storyboard artists. The episode implicitly satirizes use of swear words among children, based on the writers' own childhood experiences.

The episode was well-received from critics and fans, with various members of the SpongeBob SquarePants crew considering it to be one of their favorites due to its satirical nature. However, the episode was not immune to negative reception, and was criticized by watchdog media group the Parents Television Council, who interpreted the episode as an example of promoting use of profanity among children. The song used for the title card is a sea shanty called "Sailing over the Dogger Bank".

Plot
When SpongeBob goes around to the back of the Krusty Krab to take out the trash, he reads some graffiti written on a dumpster, one of which contains a word he does not understand. SpongeBob asks Patrick, who says that the word is a "sentence enhancer" which is used "when you want to talk fancy." The next day, SpongeBob walks into the Krusty Krab and says the word to Patrick and then over to the intercom, causing the customers to complain and leave. Squidward then informs Mr. Krabs, who tells them that they were using a bad word; he mentions that there are thirteen bad words that they should never use (though Squidward thought that there were only seven). SpongeBob and Patrick vow to never use the eleventh bad word again.

Later, they play their favorite game, Eels and Escalators; Spongebob loses and accidentally utters the bad word in frustration. Patrick then races to the Krusty Krab to tell Mr. Krabs with SpongeBob trying to stop him. Patrick also uses the word during the chase, leading SpongeBob to burst through the front door and tell Mr. Krabs that Patrick said the bad word, with Patrick joining along. Eventually, Mr. Krabs stops their gibberish explanations and tells them to simply explain the problem. Once they do, Mr. Krabs angrily removes them from the restaurant and prepares a punishment. SpongeBob and Patrick make a vow to stop using the bad word, be good citizens like Mr. Krabs.

As Mr. Krabs is about to tell them to paint the restaurant as punishment, he hits his foot on a rock, prompting him to yell out all thirteen bad words in pain. When SpongeBob and Patrick hear the bad words, they run to Mama Krabs' house to tattle on him. The three reach her house at the same time, and all explain what happened at once, saying the same bad words in the process. After she briefly faints, Mr. Krabs accuses them of causing her to faint, before Mama Krabs regains consciousness and chastises them all for their actions. She then tells them to paint her house as punishment. Later, Mama Krabs goes to reward them with lemonade for their hard work, but she hits her foot on a rock like Mr. Krabs did. When she complains about her injury, SpongeBob, Patrick, and Mr. Krabs are shocked at her apparent bad language, though the noises turn out to be Old Man Jenkins honking in his jalopy.

Production

The animation of "Sailor Mouth" was directed by Andrew Overtoom, and the episode was written by Walt Dohrn, Paul Tibbitt, and Merriwether Williams. Dohrn and Tibbitt served as the episode's storyboard directors, and Carson Kugler, William Reiss and Erik Wiese worked as storyboard artists. Series creator Stephen Hillenburg has described the episode plot as "a classic thing all kids go through." Much of the storyline for the episode was inspired by the writers' own experiences from childhood. The episode originally aired on Nickelodeon in the United States on September 21, 2001. The episode marks the introduction of Mr. Krabs' mother, Mama Krabs, who was voiced by former SpongeBob SquarePants creative producer and current executive producer Paul Tibbitt.

The writing staff used their individual childhood experiences as inspirations to come up with much of the story lines for this episode. The idea for "Sailor Mouth" was inspired by creative director Derek Drymon's experience "[when] I got in trouble for saying the f-word in front of my mother." Drymon said, "The scene where Patrick is running to Mr. Krabs to tattle, with SpongeBob chasing him, is pretty much how it happened in real life." The end of the episode, where Mr. Krabs uses more profanity than SpongeBob and Patrick, was also inspired "by the fact that my [Drymon's] mother has a sailor mouth herself."

The initial decision to use dolphin noises in place of a traditional bleep was influenced by concerns over the episode's suitability for its audience. Stephen Hillenburg recalled in 2016, "I pitched the idea that SpongeBob and Patrick learn a swearword. Everyone said no. I couldn't even use a bleep. So I used a dolphin sound instead." Voice actor Tom Kenny reveals in the description of this episode in the iTunes collection, SpongeBob SquarePants: Tom Kenny's Top 20, that they actually improvised fake profanities that would be censored by the humorous sound effects later. He adds jokingly, "I was laughing so hard [recording this episode], they recorded me while I lay on the floor of the sound booth."

The scene where SpongeBob and Patrick playing a game of Eels and Escalators, which is a parody of Snakes and Ladders, was difficult for the crew to animate, since many shots featured certain board pieces changing location.  Storyboard artist Erik Wiese admitted that it was a challenge to storyboard Walt Dohrn's idea and vision of the Eels and Escalators scene.

"Sailor Mouth" was released on the DVD compilation called SpongeBob SquarePants: Sea Stories on November 5, 2002. It was also included in the SpongeBob SquarePants: The Complete 2nd Season DVD released on October 19, 2004. On September 22, 2009, "Sailor Mouth" was released on the SpongeBob SquarePants: The First 100 Episodes DVD, alongside all the episodes of seasons one through five.

Reception
The episode received generally positive reviews from critics and fans. In 2018 Nancy Basile of About.com ranked the episode at number two for her list of the Top 10 SpongeBob SquarePants Episodes (behind "Band Geeks"). She said "'Sailor Mouth' just barely missed being in the number one slot." Basile praised the episode's plot and called it "genius[...] because children can relate to the forbidden thrill of using curse words, and adults can laugh at the parody of TV censorship." Erik Wiese, who helped to storyboard "Sailor Mouth", considers it to be his favorite episode, mainly due to its random and satirical nature, saying "Sometimes SpongeBob just catches me off-guard." In an interview with Paul Tibbitt, one of the episode's writers, he said that "Sailor Mouth" is his second favorite SpongeBob episode.

The Eels and Escalators board game from the episode has become a memorable scene among fans. In 2021, BoxLunch and Nickelodeon collaborated to produce a re-creation of the board game that it currently available to purchase.

Criticism and controversies

According to a report titled Wolves in Sheep's Clothing, which documents the increase in potentially violent, profane, and sexual content in children's programming, the Parents Television Council, a watchdog media group, critics, and fans believed the SpongeBob SquarePants episode "Sailor Mouth" was an implicit attempt to promote and satirize use of profanity among children. The episode originally aired during the 2001–02 television season, ironically the season in which the PTC named SpongeBob SquarePants among the best programs on cable television, but the report cited a repeat broadcast of this episode from 2005 to prove its point that it promoted use of profanity among children. In a later report, several members of the PTC listed "Sailor Mouth" as an example of how levels of profane, sexual, and violent activity has increased in children's television programming. Nickelodeon, in response to the incident, said "It's sad and a little desperate that they stooped to literally putting profane language in the mouths of our characters to make a point. Has the FCC looked at this?" Richard Huff of the New York Daily News criticized the report for misinterpreting "Sailor Mouth" over its intent to satirize profanity implicitly.

See also
"Rude Removal", a similar episode of Dexter's Laboratory.
"Bleep", a similar episode of Arthur.

Notes

References

External links

2001 American television episodes
Animation controversies in television
Television controversies in the United States
SpongeBob SquarePants episodes
Television episodes about profanity